Greta Hayes (born 17 October 1996) is an Australian field hockey player.

Career

Junior National Team
Hayes first represented Australia's Under 21 side, the Jillaroos, at the 2016 Junior Oceania Cup. The tournament served as a qualifier for the 2016 Junior World Cup held in Chile.

In October 2016, Hayes was named in the Jillaroos team for the Junior World Cup. At the tournament, Hayes scored two goals, with the team securing the bronze medal after defeating Spain in a penalty shoot-out.

Senior National Team
In 2017, Hayes was named in the Australian national development squad for the first time.

Hayes made her international debut for Australia in November 2018, at the Hockey Champions Trophy. Hayes was one of four players included in the team who were not part of Hockey Australia's centralised training program at the time.

Hayes qualified for the Tokyo 2020 Olympics. She was part of the Hockeyroos Olympics squad. The Hockeyroos lost 1-0 to India in the quarterfinals and therefore were not in medal contention.

References

External links
 
 
 

1996 births
Living people
Australian female field hockey players
Female field hockey midfielders
Field hockey players at the 2020 Summer Olympics
Olympic field hockey players of Australia
Field hockey players at the 2022 Commonwealth Games
21st-century Australian women
Commonwealth Games silver medallists for Australia
Commonwealth Games medallists in field hockey
Sportspeople from Sydney
Sportswomen from New South Wales
Field hockey people from New South Wales
Medallists at the 2022 Commonwealth Games